Zlatopol is a rural locality (a selo) and the administrative center of Zlatopolinsky Selsoviet, Kulundinsky District, Altai Krai, Russia. The population was 700 as of 2013. There are 8 streets.

Geography 
Zlatopol is located 29 km northeast of Kulunda (the district's administrative centre) by road. 24 km is the nearest rural locality.

References 

Rural localities in Kulundinsky District